Krajenka  is a town in the Greater Poland Voivodeship of Poland. It has 3,804 inhabitants (2005) and lies in Złotów County.

Geographical location 
Krajenka is located approximately 15 kilometers south of Złotów, 50 kilometers south-east of Szczecinek and 160 kilometers east of the regional center, Szczecin. It is located on the  river, a tributary of the Gwda river. It is part of the ethnographic region of Krajna, located in the northern part of the historic Greater Poland region.

History 

The first mention of the town is from 1286, back then it belonged to noble family of Danaborski whose Coat of Arms was Toporczyk. The name of the town itself comes from the Polish word Krajna, which meant in the past a location on the borders of Polish state. Throughout centuries it was connected to Polish royalty and such families as Danaborski, Dahlke, Kościelecki, Grudziński, Działyński, Sułkowski, Komierowski.

Magdeburg city rights were granted in 1420 by the Polish king Władysław Jagiełło.

Following the First Partition of Poland, in 1772 it was annexed by Prussia. In 1787 the city suffered a fire. After the last Polish owner of the town  was killed by the Prussians in 1809, the town was confiscated by Prussian officials and passed from Polish to German hands. In 1846 a Protestant church was built by the famous German architect Carl Friedrich Schinkel. In 1871 a railway station of the Prussian Eastern Railway was built south of the  river. The town was then the property of Prince Friedrich Leopold of Prussia. According to the German census of 1890, the town had a population of 3,344, of which 400 (12%) were Poles.

Despite the policy of Germanisation, local Poles in the early 20th century founded the People's Bank and a Polish Catholic Society. After Poland regained independence in 1918, the Polish inhabitants made efforts to reintegrate the town with Poland, but despite their requests and protests, the Treaty of Versailles granted the town to Germany. Then it was made part of the province of Grenzmark Posen-Westpreußen. On 21 June 1924, the town made history within German law as the Reichsgericht confirmed private ownership by Prinz Friedrich Leopold, including, where he died in 1931. In 1931, local Poles founded a Polish school. Its teacher, Franciszek Gliszewski, was arrested and murdered by the Germans in the Flossenbürg concentration camp after the outbreak of World War II in 1939.

On 30 January 1945 the Soviet Red Army occupied the abandoned and severely destroyed town during the final stages of World War II. Many of the inhabitants had fled during the winter of 1944/1945. After the war the town was finally reintegrated with Poland under the Potsdam Agreement.

Number of inhabitants by year 

Note that the table is based on primary, possibly inaccurate or biased sources.<ref name="VWG" >Michael Rademacher: Deutsche Verwaltungsgeschichte Provinz Pommern, Kreis Flatow (2006).</ref>F. W. F. Schmitt: Topographie des Flatower Kreises. In: Preußische Provinzialblätter, Andere Folge, Band VII, Königsberg 1855, pp. 115-116.

Notable people
  (1914-1939), Polish Catholic priest, murdered by the Germans during World War II
 Siggi Wilzig (1926-2003), Auschwitz Holocaust survivor, CEO of Wilshire Oil Company

See also
Krojanker, several surnames derived from the names of the location

 References 

 External links 
 Official website of Krajenka
 William Remus: [http://remus.shidler.hawaii.edu/genes/WPrussia/krojanke/home.htm Krojanke (Krojanka)] (2008)

Cities and towns in Greater Poland Voivodeship
Złotów County